The 2014 Singapore Darts Masters was the inaugural staging of the tournament by the Professional Darts Corporation, as a second entry in the 2014 World Series of Darts. The tournament took place at the Singapore Indoor Stadium, Singapore on 15–16 August 2014. The tournament featured eight players, of which two players were wildcard choices.

Michael van Gerwen won the title by defeating Simon Whitlock 11–8 in the final.

Prize money
The total prize fund for the event for £125,000.

Qualifiers
The top six in the Order of Merit as of June 2014 qualified for the event, with the top 4 seeded, with the exception of Adrian Lewis, who rejected the invitation. The top six included:

  Michael van Gerwen (winner)
  Phil Taylor (quarter-finals)
  Adrian Lewis (withdrew)  Simon Whitlock (runner-up)
  Peter Wright (quarter-finals)
  Dave Chisnall (semi-finals)
  James Wade (semi-finals)

Wildcards:
  Raymond van Barneveld (quarter-finals)
  Andy Hamilton (quarter-finals)

Draw
Schedule of play:

Broadcasting
The Singapore Darts Masters was broadcast live on Sky Sports in the United Kingdom and Ireland, on RTL 7 in the Netherlands, on Fox Sports in Australia and on Sky New Zealand.

References

Singapore Darts Masters
Darts Masters
Singapore Darts Masters
World Series of Darts